

Season summary
During the 2002–03 season, Real Sociedad were involved in a title race for the first time in decades.

After a series of impressive performances, stretching from September to February the club reached the top of the table. During February  and March their  league form faltered, and the title challenge looked over. However the club managed to re-establish itself back at the top in April. An emphatic 4-2 defeat of Real Madrid’s galacticos at Anoeta in April was the team’s signature performance.

The turning point came in early June. Failing to beat Valencia and losing away to Celta de Vigo- who were after a UCL qualification spot- meant that the Guipuscoan club missed on the league trophy. On the last match day a home victory against Atlético Madrid was sterile, as Real Madrid defeated Athletic Bilbao and thus became league champions. 
A home draw against Villareal in March is also blamed for this outcome.

The club’s fanbase and the entire province paid tribute to the squad regardless of their failure to win the trophy.

Squad
Squad at end of season

Left club during season

Player stats

Competitions

La Liga

League table

References

Real Sociedad seasons
Real Sociedad